The Getty Address is an album by American experimental rock group Dirty Projectors.

The album is a concept album and is described as "a glitch opera" about musician Don Henley, although it also explores themes like ancient Mexico, post-9/11 America, and oil.

Background and recording
The album boasts over 25 musicians on it, most of whom contributed to the orchestral and choral backing of the album. These parts were recorded at Yale University as well as other locations in New Haven, Connecticut over a period spanning five months and were chopped up digitally to create the backings of the album. Dave Longstreth then overdubbed his own vocals, guitar, bass, and other instruments to create the songs on the album. Although the lyrics have been described as gibberish, the words actually do tell a narrative beginning with Don Henley contemplating suicide, and ending with a new installment of Longstreth's songs involving brown finches.

Jason Crock, in a review for Pitchfork, for example, noted that "Longstreth's thorough deconstruction of classical elements gives the colonization theme [of "confrontation between Hernan Cortes and the Aztecs in the early 16th century"] some precedence."

In a letter to the Eagles' Don Henley, Longstreth described the album's ambitious themes as examining the question of "what is wilderness in a world completely circumscribed by highways, once Manifest Destiny has no place to go - but in the end it is a love story." Despite seeming a "disjointed listen" in which songs toss "verse-chorus-verse out the window," the New York Times' Jon Pareles finds the album "far more a contemporary chamber opera than indie-rock." Its "dissonances and complexities" juxtapose the "sustained with the pointillistic," mirroring the characters' "pensive but restless" wanderings.

Release
A slightly abridged version was released as a DVD with original animated videos directed by James Sumner in 2005 for all songs except "Tour Along the Potomac," "Jolly Jolly Jolly Ego," "Drilling Profitably" and "Finches' Song at Oceanic Parking Lot."

In 2010, Dirty Projectors collaborated with Alarm Will Sound to create a live-performance version of The Getty Address.  Transcription and arrangements were done by Alarm Will Sound members Matt Marks, Alan Pierson and Chris Thompson.  The piece was performed by both groups at Lincoln Center, Disney Hall, and the Barbican Centre.

Critical reception

The Getty Address has received widespread acclaim from contemporary music critics and retrospective reviews.

In their Top Concept Albums list, Consequence of Sound ranked The Getty Address at number one.

Track listing

References 

2005 albums
Dirty Projectors albums
Western Vinyl albums
Albums produced by David Longstreth